Edisto Ice Tongue is an ice tongue along the northwest margin of the Bunger Hills where it occupies the southwestern portion of Edisto Channel, in the Highjump Archipelago. The ice tongue is a seaward extension of the flow of Apfel Glacier as well as part of the main flow of Scott Glacier. It was mapped from air photos taken by U.S. Navy Operation Highjump, 1946–47, and was named by the Advisory Committee on Antarctic Names in association with Edisto Channel.

References 

Ice tongues of Antarctica
Headlands of Queen Mary Land